John Joseph Wintermeyer (December 4, 1916 – December 20, 1993) was a politician in Ontario, Canada. He was a Liberal member of the Legislative Assembly of Ontario from 1955 to 1963 who represented the riding of Waterloo North. From 1958 to 1963 he served as leader of the Liberal party.

Background
Wintermeyer was born and raised in Kitchener, Ontario. His parents were Alfred and Caroline Wintermeyer. He attended University of Notre Dame in South Bend, Indiana and graduated with a degree in Commerce and Philosophy in 1939. He then went to Harvard Law School and later Dalhousie Law School. He became a lawyer and returned to his home town to begin his practice. In 1949 he established his own firm which became known as Wintermeyer Askin Casey Smith. In 1944, he marry Helen Delaney and together they raised seven children. After Helen died in 1972, he married Elizabeth Ann Lang Greene in 1980.

Politics
Wintermeyer enter politics as a municipal alderman for Kitchener City Council. He served three terms before moving to provincial politics.

In the 1955 provincial election, Wintermeyer ran as the Liberal candidate in the riding of Waterloo North. He defeated Progressive Conservative incumbent Stanley Francis Leavine by 2,264 votes.
and was chosen leader of the Ontario Liberal Party in 1958.

In the 1959 election, the Liberals under Wintermeyer's leadership increased their legislative caucus from 10 to 21, but were unable to prevent the ruling Ontario Progressive Conservative Party of Premier Leslie Frost from winning another majority. In the campaign, Wintermeyer promoted policies such as universal medicare, improvements to general welfare assistance, amalgamation of the various municipalities that made up Metropolitan Toronto, and full funding of Catholic schools. Wintermeyer had long been an advocate of a provincial sales tax, which put him in a difficult position when the Frost government introduced a 3% retail sales tax in 1961. While Wintermeyer personally supported the tax, his caucus did not, and he was forced to publicly renounce his support.

In the 1963 election, the Liberals increased their total seats by two, but Wintermeyer lost his seat of Waterloo North, and he resigned as party leader. He was succeeded as party leader by Andy Thompson.

Later life
After leaving politics, He served as director of television station CKCO in Kitchener and was also a director at Kent Trust until it merged with Metropolitan Trust. He served as chairman of the board of Bauer Industries and director of York Centre Corporation. He also served as chair of the Metro Toronto Roman Catholic high schools and the Canadian Olympic Association. He died in 1993 after suffering from Lou Gehrig's disease.

References

Notes

Citations

External links

1916 births
1993 deaths
Canadian Roman Catholics
Kitchener, Ontario city councillors
Leaders of the Ontario Liberal Party
Ontario Liberal Party MPPs
University of Notre Dame alumni
Schulich School of Law alumni
Harvard Law School alumni